Canyon Passage is a 1946 American Western film directed by Jacques Tourneur and set in frontier Oregon. It stars Dana Andrews, Susan Hayward and Brian Donlevy. Featuring love triangles and an Indian uprising, the film was adapted from the 1945 Saturday Evening Post novel Canyon Passage by Ernest Haycox. Hoagy Carmichael (music) and Jack Brooks (lyrics) were nominated for Academy Award for Best Original Song for "Ole Buttermilk Sky."

Plot
In 1856, ambitious freight company and store owner Logan Stuart agrees to escort Lucy Overmire home to the settlement of Jacksonville, Oregon, along with his latest shipment. Lucy is engaged to Logan's best friend, George Camrose. The night before they depart, however, Logan has to defend himself from a sneak attack in his hotel room; though it is too dark to be sure, he believes his assailant is Honey Bragg. Later, he explains to Lucy that he once saw Bragg leaving the vicinity of two murdered miners. Despite Logan's unwillingness to accuse Bragg (since he did not actually witness the crime), Bragg apparently wants to take no chances.

On their journey, Logan and Lucy become attracted to each other. They stop one night at the homestead of Ben Dance and his family. There, Logan introduces Lucy to his girlfriend, Caroline Marsh.

In Jacksonville, Logan tries to get George to stop playing poker with (and losing to) professional gambler Jack Lestrade, even giving him $2000 to pay off his debts, but George is more interested in the prospect of getting rich quick without hard work. What Logan does not know is that George has been stealing gold dust left in his safekeeping by the miners to pay some of his losses. George also has a secret he is keeping from Lucy; he keeps propositioning Lestrade's wife Marta, though she shows no interest in him.

Meanwhile, the burly Bragg keeps trying to provoke Logan into a fight. Finally, he succeeds. Logan wins, but does not kill his opponent when he has the chance. A humiliated Bragg tries to ride Logan down on his way out of town.

George decides to move away to make a fresh start and finally gets Lucy to agree to marry him. Logan then proposes to Caroline and is accepted, much to the disappointment of Vane Blazier, Logan's employee, who is in love with Caroline himself.

Lucy decides to accompany Logan to San Francisco to pick out a wedding dress. Along the way, they are ambushed by Bragg. Though their horses are shot dead, they get away and return to town, only to discover that George is in grave trouble.

When a miner appears months earlier than George had expected and informs him that he wants to get his gold the next day, George kills the drunk man late that night. However, his crimes are traced to him; shopkeeper Hi Linnet saw him stealing some gold, and the miner's lucky gold nugget is found in George's possession. The locals, led by Johnny Steele, find George guilty of murder and lock him up, intending a late-night lynching. However, when one of the settlers rides in with the warning that the Indians are on the warpath after Bragg killed a woman, Logan helps his friend escape in the confusion.

Logan organizes a party to fight. When Bragg seeks their protection, Logan drives him off, to be killed by the Indians. They are then driven off by Logan's men.

Afterward, Logan and Lucy learn that George was found and killed by one of the townsfolk. Caroline also has second thoughts about marriage to a man who is away so frequently on business; she breaks their engagement and accepts Vane. Logan and Lucy are free to follow their hearts.

Cast

 Dana Andrews as Logan Stuart
 Brian Donlevy as George Camrose
 Susan Hayward as Lucy Overmire
 Patricia Roc as Caroline Marsh
 Ward Bond as Honey Bragg
 Hoagy Carmichael as Hi Linnet
 Fay Holden as Mrs. Overmire
 Stanley Ridges as Jonas Overmire
 Lloyd Bridges as Johnny Steele
 Andy Devine as Ben Dance
 Victor Cutler as Vane Blazier
 Rose Hobart as Marta Lestrade
 Halliwell Hobbes as Clenchfield 
 James Cardwell as Gray Bartlett
 Onslow Stevens as Jack Lestrade
 Erville Alderson as Judge (uncredited)
 Richard Alexander as Miner (uncredited) 
 Harlan Briggs as Dr. Balance (uncredited)
 Dorothy Peterson as Mrs. Dance (uncredited)
 Ray Teal as Neal Howison (uncredited)

Reception
The film's premiere in Portland, Oregon attracted large crowds as Wanger and the actors arrived in the city, featuring a Native American ceremony and a parade through Portland's streets led by Governor Earl Snell.

The location photography in Umpqua National Forest and the performances by Hayward and Roc were praised by critics from Time and The New York Times.

According to Variety, the film earned $2,250,000 in rentals in 1946 but resulted in a loss of $63,784.

References

External links
 
 
 
 

1946 films
1946 Western (genre) films
American Western (genre) films
Films based on American novels
Films based on Western (genre) novels
Films directed by Jacques Tourneur
Films produced by Walter Wanger
Films scored by Frank Skinner
Films set in Oregon
Films set in the 1850s
Films shot in Oregon
Universal Pictures films
1940s English-language films
1940s American films